Darnell Jarod Carter (born November 27, 1987) is an arena football linebacker who is currently a free agent.

Early life
Carter attended Dwight Morrow High School in Englewood, New Jersey where he participated in both football and basketball. As member of the football team, Carter played both tight end and linebacker.

Carter committed to the University of Virginia on September 12, 2005. Carter was not heavily recruited, receiving FBS scholarships from Illinois and Virginia, as well as one FCS scholarship from Delaware.

College career
Carter attended the University of Virginia, where he played as a member of the football team from 2006-2007, and 2009-2010. Carter missed the 2008 season when he was academically suspended.

Professional career

Pre-draft
Prior to the 2011 NFL Draft, Carter was projected to be undrafted by NFLDraftScout.com. He was rated as the 114th-best inside linebacker in the draft. He was not invited to the NFL Scouting Combine, he posted the following numbers during his Virginia pro-day workouts:

Iowa Barnstomers
Carter was assigned the Iowa Barnstormers of the Arena Football League during the 2012 season. Carter re-signed with the Barnstormers for the 2013 season. On April 19, 2013, Carter scored his first professional touchdown, returning a Bernard Morris fumble for a touchdown. After the 2013 season, Carter was named the Barnstormers' Special Teams Player of the Year. Carter was assigned to the Barnstormers again on January 2, 2014.

Arizona Rattlers
On February 17, 2014, Carter was traded to the Arizona Rattlers in exchange for Cody Johnson.

Jacksonville Sharks
On March 1, 2014, Carter was traded to the Jacksonville Sharks for future considerations.

Return to Iowa
On May 28, 2014, Carter was traded back to Iowa for future considerations.

References

1987 births
Living people
Virginia Cavaliers football players
Iowa Barnstormers players
Arizona Rattlers players
Jacksonville Sharks players
Dwight Morrow High School alumni
People from Englewood, New Jersey

Players of American football from New Jersey
Sportspeople from Bergen County, New Jersey